Animal Nocturno was a Chilean television talk show hosted by Felipe Camiroaga, and broadcast by state-owned television station Televisión Nacional de Chile. It ran nationally for nine seasons, beginning on 16 April 2006, and concluding in late January 2011.

The show was conceived by the creative production team of Televisión Nacional de Chile. Some of Camiroaga's interviewees in Animal Nocturno were former President of Chile Michelle Bachelet, current President Sebastián Piñera, television presenter Raquel Argandoña, his half-sister Paola Bontempi, amid others.

References

External links
Official Animal Nocturno website 

2006 Chilean television series debuts
2011 Chilean television series endings